The 1996 Southwest Conference women's basketball tournament was held March 6–9, 1996, at Moody Coliseum in Dallas, Texas. 

Number 4 seed  defeated 2 seed  72-68 to win their 1st championship and receive the conference's automatic bid to the 1996 NCAA tournament.

Format and seeding 
The tournament consisted of an 8 team single-elimination tournament.

Tournament

References 

Southwest Conference women's Basketball Tournament
1996 in American women's basketball
Basketball in Dallas
1996 in sports in Texas